Hutchinson County Airport  is a county-owned, public-use airport two miles north of Borger, Texas. The FAA's National Plan of Integrated Airport Systems for 2011–2015 categorized it as a general aviation facility.

Facilities
It has two asphalt runways: 17/35 is 6,300 by 100 feet (1,920 x 30 m) and 3/21 is 3,898 by 100 feet (1,188 x 30 m).

In the 12-month period ending June 27, 2009 the airport had 5,610 aircraft operations, average 108 per day: 62% local general aviation, 37% transient general aviation, and <1% military. 24 aircraft were then based at the airport: 83% single-engine, 4% multi-engine, and 13% ultralight.

Hutchinson County Airport has four certified instrument approach procedures: two RNAV (GPS), one VOR/DME, and one VOR approach.

Past airlines

The airport had scheduled passenger flights on Central Airlines and successor Frontier Airlines (1950-1986) and later on commuter airline Air Central.

Central Airlines began serving Borger in the early 1950s with Douglas DC-3s to Dallas Love Field, Fort Worth (via Amon Carter Field or Meacham Field), Oklahoma City and Tulsa. In 1966 Central DC-3s flew Denver-Colorado Springs-Pueblo, CO-Amarillo-Borger-Oklahoma City-Bartlesville, OK-Parsons, KS-Kansas City. Central merged into Frontier which in 1967 flew Convair 600s Amarillo-Borger-Oklahoma City-Bartlesville, OK-Kansas City. By 1970 Frontier had left Borger. In 1979 commuter airline Air Central flew Piper Navajos to Oklahoma City.

The airport currently has no airlines.

References

External links 
 Hutchinson County Airport
  from Texas DOT Airport Directory
 Aerial image as of March 1996 from USGS The National Map
 

Airports in Texas
Buildings and structures in Hutchinson County, Texas
Transportation in Hutchinson County, Texas